Ricky Parkey (born November 7, 1956) is an American former professional boxer who held the IBF cruiserweight title from 1986 to 1987.

Professional career

Parkey turned professional in 1981 and won the IBF cruiserweight title with a TKO win over Lee Roy Murphy in 1986. He defended the belt once before losing the title to Evander Holyfield via TKO the following year in a title unification bout. He retired in 1994.

Professional boxing record

See also
List of world cruiserweight boxing champions

References

External links

1956 births
Living people
American male boxers
African-American boxers
Boxers from Tennessee
People from Morristown, Tennessee
Cruiserweight boxers
World cruiserweight boxing champions
International Boxing Federation champions